JCP may refer to:

Java Community Process, a method of handling software requests
J. C. Penney, a United States department store chain
Jenny Craig Pavilion, an arena at the University of San Diego
Jim Crockett Promotions, a former professional wrestling company
Jobcentre Plus, an employment-related agency within the UK government 
Joint Combat Pistol, a U.S. military arms program
Jones College Prep High School, a high school in Chicago, Illinois
Journal of Chemical Physics, a scientific journal
Journal of Computational Physics, a scientific journal
Journal of Consumer Psychology, an academic journal on psychology 
Judicial corporal punishment
Justice and Construction Party (Libya)

Communist groups:
Japanese Communist Party 
Jordanian Communist Party 
Portuguese Communist Youth (Juventude Comunista Portuguesa, or JCP, in Portuguese)